The 1932 Kansas gubernatorial election took place on November 8, 1932. Democrat Harry H. Woodring, the incumbent Governor of Kansas, was narrowly defeated by Alf Landon, a Republican. Landon polled 34.82%, Woodring 34.14%, and John R. Brinkley, an independent, polled 30.58%.

Results
Landon won 34 counties, Woodring won 31 counties, and Brinkley won 40 counties.

See also
 List of third party performances in United States gubernatorial elections

References

1932
Gubernatorial
Kansas
November 1932 events in the United States